Linping South railway station is a railway station of the Shanghai–Hangzhou high-speed railway located in Linping District, Hangzhou, Zhejiang, China.

History
The station opened on October 26, 2010. It was renamed from Yuhang railway station to Linping South railway station on November 18, 2021.

Metro station
This station is served by a station of the same name on Line 9 and the Hanghai line of the Hangzhou Metro.

References

Railway stations in Zhejiang
Stations on the Nanjing–Hangzhou High-Speed Railway
Hangzhou Metro stations
Railway stations in China opened in 2010